Taxiing (rarely spelled taxying) is the movement of an aircraft on the ground, under its own power, in contrast to towing or pushback where the aircraft is moved by a tug. The aircraft usually moves on wheels, but the term also includes aircraft with skis or floats (for water-based travel).

An airplane uses taxiways to taxi from one place on an airport to another; for example, when moving from a hangar to the runway.  The term "taxiing" is not used for the accelerating run along a runway prior to takeoff, or the decelerating run immediately after landing, which are called the takeoff roll and landing rollout, respectively.

Etymology 

As early as 1909 aviation journalists envisioned aeroplanes to replace the taxicab in traffic-congested cities. 

Some aviators and some linguists report that around the year 1911 the slang word "taxi" was in use for an "airplane". They suggest that the way aircraft move under power before they take off or after they land reminded someone of the way taxicabs slowly drove around the block when looking for passengers.

Also by 1909, French aviation pioneers like Blériot, Farman and Voisin used the term "taxi" for a trainer aircraft, that was so constructed that a pupil would not accidentally get airborne.

Usage of the word for an airplane quickly disappeared again, but the verb "to taxi" stuck, and words like the "taxiway" were derived from it.

Propulsion 

The thrust to propel the aircraft forward comes from its propellers or jet engines. Reverse thrust for backing up can be generated by thrust reversers such as on the Boeing C-17 Globemaster III, or reversible pitch propellers such as on the Lockheed C-130 Hercules, a procedure known as powerback. Most aircraft, however, are not designed to back up on their own and must be pushed back either by hand or by using an aircraft tug.

At low power settings, combustion aircraft engines operate at lower efficiency than at cruise power settings. A typical A320 spends an average of 3.5 hours a day taxiing, using  of fuel. Hybrid electrically driven nose gear are under development to allow high use aircraft to shut down the engines during taxi operations.

Control 

Steering is achieved by turning a nose wheel or tail wheel/rudder; the pilot controls the direction travelled with their feet. Larger jet aircraft have a tiller wheel on the left side of the cockpit that acts as a steering wheel allowing the nosewheel to be turned hydraulically. Braking is controlled by differential toe or heel brakes. Not all aircraft have steerable wheels, and in some cases steering is solely by means of differential braking (all Van's aircraft for instance) or solely by means of the rudder (including all floatplanes).

Hover taxi 

Skid-equipped helicopters and other VTOL (Vertical Take-Off and Landing) aircraft conduct hover taxiing to move in ground effect in the same manner that wheel-equipped aircraft ground taxi.

The Bell CH-135 Twin Huey is hover taxied in a manner typical for skid-equipped aircraft of that size:

Safety 

When taxiing, aircraft travel slowly. This ensures that they can be stopped quickly and do not risk wheel damage on larger aircraft if they accidentally turn off the paved surface. Taxi speeds are typically .

Rotor downwash limits helicopter hover-taxiing near parked light aircraft. The use of engine thrust near terminals is restricted due to the possibility of structural damage or injury to personnel caused by jet blast.

References

External links 

 aircraft
 

Aircraft operations
Flight phases